Georg Martin Preisler (fl. 1750) was a German engraver. Born in Nuremberg, he was the son of Johann Daniel Preisler. He was most notable for his portraits and a series of twenty-one engravings of classical and neo-classical sculptures in Rome, based on drawings made there by his brother Johan Martin Preisler

References

German engravers
Artists from Nuremberg
18th-century German people